Ian Galvin is an Irish hurler who plays for the Clare senior team. He is the brother of fellow Clare hurler Colm Galvin.
He made his first National Hurling League start for Clare on 12 March 2017 against Dublin in the 2017 National Hurling League where he scored three points.

Career statistics

Honours

Ardscoil Rís
Harty Cup: 2014

University of Limerick
Fitzgibbon Cup: 2018
All-Ireland Freshers' Hurling Championship: 2015

Clonlara
Clare Senior B Hurling Championship: 2020

References

1996 births
Living people
Clonlara hurlers
Clare inter-county hurlers